Vanur may refer to:
 Vanur taluk
 Vanur (state assembly constituency)
 Vanur block